Lokesh Cinematic Universe (LCU) is an Indian shared universe of action thriller films created by Lokesh Kanagaraj. The first feature of the universe Kaithi was released in 2019 and the second installment Vikram was released on 3 June 2022. It is the third highest grossing Tamil film franchise.

LCU

Cast and characters 

m refers to the character being mentioned.

Reception

Box office performance 
The Lokesh Cinematic Universe is one of the highest-grossing Tamil film franchises.

References

Action film franchises
Continuity (fiction)
Fictional universes
Film series introduced in 2019
Indian film series
Mass media franchises introduced in 2019
Shared universes